Tarzan (also known as Disney's Action Game, Tarzan) is a 1999 platform game based on the 1999 film of the same name. Versions were released in North America for the Game Boy Color on June 28, 1999, PlayStation and Microsoft Windows on June 30, 1999, and Nintendo 64 in February 14, 2000. In 2012, the PlayStation version was made available on the PlayStation Store for PlayStation Vita.

Plot
The player takes control of the eponymous Tarzan, an orphan child who was adopted and raised by gorillas. At the beginning of the game Tarzan is still a young kid who has to learn different skills from the gorillas such as climbing trees, swinging down branches or fighting small but aggressive wild animals. He eventually grows up to be a strong and skilled man who must defend himself and his fellow animal brothers' home, the jungle, from hunters led by the evil hunter Clayton.

Gameplay
Disney's Tarzan is a 2.5D side-scrolling platform game, with gameplay taking place on a two-dimensional plane but with three-dimensional models and environments. The player controls the eponymous character of Tarzan, both as a child and as an adult, though 14 different levels. Along with running and jumping through levels, Tarzan is able to slam the ground in order to break open certain objects, as well as revealing hidden items and secret areas. Tarzan's main method of attacking enemies is by throwing assorted fruits, which can be thrown both overhand and underhand for varying throwing distances and come in 4 different levels of power marked by their colors. A knife can also be found in certain levels and used as a close-combat weapon, and certain other weapons, such as a spear and a parasol, are exclusively used in specific levels. Tarzan's health status is represented by a life bar that depletes as he is harmed by enemies and other hazards. The health bar can be refilled by collecting bananas, which are hidden in banana trees and other areas throughout levels.

Levels feature several different collectible items, such as coins that earn the player an extra life when 100 of them are collected, and four pieces of a pencil sketch which are hidden throughout the level and unlock a bonus level when collected. Scenes from the game's respective film can be unlocked by locating 6 letters (T-A-R-Z-A-N) in each level.

The game has three difficulty levels: easy, medium and hard. In the easy and medium difficulties, little Tarzan gets tips from his friend Terk. Tarzan's enemies are monkeys, baboons, eagles, Sabor the leopard, and different animals such as snakes and bushpigs, and some humans such as Clayton.

Development
The Game Boy Color version of Disney's Tarzan was developed by Digital Eclipse, who had previously developed several ports of older games including Klax, Joust and Paperboy. It was Digital Eclipse's first completely original video game which they had developed and designed from scratch, as their previous efforts had all been ports of other games. The game's development team was given 3 months to develop the game, and consisted of two programmers, ten artists and three level designers. According to the game's technical director, Mike Mika, the initial design concept for the game was "quite ambitious", with several gameplay mechanics needing to be nixed due to time constraints. According to Mika, the team wanted to include gameplay objectives which were given to the player by talking to and interacting with non-playable characters, and had concepts for several mechanics which went unincorporated, such as levels which involved riding on top of birds and levels that featured Tantor the elephant as a playable character.

Reception

Disney's Tarzan received positive reviews upon its release, with critics praising the game's graphics and its faithfulness towards the film's story.

Rick Sanchez reviewed the PlayStation version of the game for Next Generation, rating it two stars out of five, and stated that "Tarzan is a solid, if uninspired, title that gets by mostly on its looks. Serious gamers won't find much of value, but it might appeal to the kiddie set flocking to the film".

The PlayStation version of Disney's Tarzan received a "Gold" sales award from the Entertainment and Leisure Software Publishers Association (ELSPA), indicating sales of at least 200,000 copies in the United Kingdom.

Rick Sanchez reviewed the Nintendo 64 version of the game for Next Generation, rating it three stars out of five, and wrote that "Disney Interactive borrowed the best platform gaming tricks and put them together in one package. While there's nothing new or original in Disney's Tarzan, it is still a decent game".

Janice Tong from The Sydney Morning Herald gave the game three stars out of five stating: "If you have no compunction about slaughtering Disney-cute beasties, this is the game for you".

Notes

References

1999 video games
2000 video games
3D platform games
Activision games
Disney video games
Disney Interactive
Eurocom games
Game Boy Color games
Konami games
Nintendo 64 games
PlayStation (console) games
Single-player video games
Sony Interactive Entertainment games
Tarzan video games
Video games based on adaptations
Video games based on animated films
Video games based on films
Video games developed in the United Kingdom
Video games developed in the United States
Video games scored by Steve Duckworth
Video games set in Africa
Windows games
Digital Eclipse games